The United States has conducted two withdrawals of United States troops from Afghanistan:

Withdrawal of United States troops from Afghanistan (2011–2016), draw down of United States Armed Forces in the Afghanistan war
Withdrawal of United States troops from Afghanistan (2020–2021), withdrawal of all United States combat forces from Afghanistan